Yanqul is a Wilayat of Ad Dhahirah in the Sultanate of Oman.

It houses Bait al-Marah Castle, located nearby the old souq of Ynaqul.

References 

Populated places in Oman
Ad Dhahirah Governorate